The Ayodhya Municipal Corporation (Ayodhya Nagar Nigam) is the governing civic body of the cities of Ayodhya and Faizabad in the Indian state of Uttar Pradesh.

Local self-government for Ayodhya and Faizabad was introduced in 1865. The two cities were administered jointly as a municipality. The joint municipality was split on 7 January 1978 into Ayodhya Municipal Corporation and Faizabad Municipal Corporation. The Government of Uttar Pradesh made an order in May 2017, merging the two municipal corporations as Ayodhya Municipal Corporation. The governance framework, jurisdiction and function of municipal corporations in Uttar Pradesh (UP) are governed by the UP Municipalities Act 1916, and the UP Municipal Corporations Act 1959. The election for the governing body is conducted by the State Election Commission, which has its office in Faizabad.

Corporation election 2017 

Source

References

Municipal corporations in Uttar Pradesh
Year of establishment missing
Faizabad
Ayodhya